John Wieneke (March 10, 1894 – March 16, 1933) was a Major League Baseball pitcher who played in  with the Chicago White Sox. He batted right and threw left-handed.

References

External links

1894 births
1933 deaths
Major League Baseball pitchers
Baseball players from Pennsylvania
Chicago White Sox players
People from Saltsburg, Pennsylvania